Egg fried rice protests  are a form of internet protest used by Chinese internet users against the government, occurring yearly around October 23, the birthday of Mao Anying, son of Mao Zedong, or around November 25, the date of his death. Posting recipes for egg fried rice is done as a subtle jab at the death of Anying during the Korean War; such posts are usually blocked or taken down by Chinese officials and can lead to sanctions against those involved.

Background
Mao Anying worked on the staff of General Peng Dehuai in northeastern Korea during the Korean War. On the morning of November 25, 1950, he had overslept. According to some accounts, once awake, he stole eggs from the general's supplies and was cooking breakfast for himself despite orders that staff were only to cook at night for fear of American air raids. As he was making a pan of egg fried rice, he is said to have perished in a napalm attack by American forces on the area, who were drawn to the cooking fire.

While some doubt the authenticity of the story, internet users have taken to posting egg fried rice recipes yearly during the months October or November as a form of protest against the Chinese government.

Consequences
In October 2020, popular food blogger Wang Gang posted an egg fried rice recipe and was widely denounced by officials and forced to post an apology. He was accused of using the video post as "malicious political innuendo" insulting to Mao's legacy.

On October 23, 2021, a regional branch of the China Unicom company posted a fried rice recipe and had their account on Weibo suspended and all replies to the post were frozen. The account was shut down as the post "insulted the People's Volunteers" fighting with the North Korean communists during the war. A man that posted a comment on October 8, 2021, about fried rice that was deemed to be "obnoxious" by authorities was jailed for ten days. He is quoted as having posted “The greatest result of the Korean War was egg fried rice: thank you, egg fried rice! Without egg fried rice, we [China] would be no different from North Korea. Sadly, there’s not that big a difference nowadays.”

Official response
Controlling posts about egg fried rice during October and November and publicly shaming those involved "is seemingly a condoned method of constructing an internet that conforms to socialist core values." The fried rice story involving Anying's death has never been confirmed and is said to enrage Chinese nationalists and Communist Party officials. The Chinese Academy of History (中国历史研究院), a state-run institute set up in 2019, denounced the fried rice story as rumors spread by those with "vicious hearts" aiming to "gravely dwarf the heroic image of Mao Anying’s brave sacrifice." The academy, citing declassified documents, claims Mao's position was compromised through intercepted radio transmissions.

References 

Chinese political satire
Political metaphors referring to people
Protests in China
Internet censorship in China